Mount Tok Wan is a mountain located on the summit of Broga Hill in Semenyih, Hulu Langat District, Selangor, Malaysia. It rises to 675 m (2,215 ft) at its peak. The mountain is reported to have been discovered by a group of officers from Kajang Prison in 2010. The hike up Gunung Tok Wan is rated moderate to hard. Hikers must first summit Broga Hill before continuing up Mount Tok Wan.

References

Hulu Langat District
Tok Wan